Seine-Maritime is a department of France in the Normandy region of northern France. It is situated on the northern coast of France, at the mouth of the Seine, and includes the cities of Rouen and Le Havre. Until 1955 it was named Seine-Inférieure. It had a population of 1,255,633 in 2019.

History 

1790 - Creation of the Seine-Inférieure department
The department was created from part of the old province of Normandy during the French revolution, on 4 March 1790, through the application of a law of 22 December 1789.

1815 - Occupation
After the victory at Waterloo of the coalition armies, the department was occupied by British forces from June 1815 till November 1818.

1843 – Railways and industry
In Rouen, Elbeuf, and Bolbec, the number of textile factories is increasing. Metallurgy and naval construction as well.

1851 - A republican department
Following President Louis-Napoléon Bonaparte's 1851 Coup d'état, Seine-Inférieure was one of several departments placed under a state of emergency (literally, in French, state of siege)  following fears of significant resistance to the new government.

 World War II
In 1942, during occupation by Nazi Germany, two Allied raids, the Bruneval and Dieppe, took place at towns of the channel coast of Seine-Inférieure.

Heraldry

Geography 
The department can be split into three main areas:
 The Seine valley. The Seine flows through the provincial capital Rouen.
 The chalk plateau Pays de Caux, with its abrupt coastline (the Alabaster Coast). 
 The Norman Pays de Bray, with its hills and bocage landscape.

Administration
The département was created in 1790 as Seine-Inférieure, one of five departements that replaced the former province of Normandy. In 1800 five arrondissements were created within the département, namely Rouen, Le Havre, Dieppe, Neufchatel and Yvetot, although the latter two were disbanded in 1926. On 18 January 1955 the name of the département was changed to Seine-Maritime, in order to provide a more positive-sounding name and in-keeping with changes made in a number of other French departements.

Principal towns

The most populous commune is Le Havre; the prefecture Rouen is the second-most populous. As of 2019, there are 7 communes with more than 20,000 inhabitants:

Demographics

Previously lacking a demonym, the inhabitants of Seine-Maritime (as the department had been renamed in 1955) chose, following a public consultation, to be identified in official documents as "Seinomarins"  (males) and "Seinomarines" (females).

Politics

The president of the Departmental Council is Bertrand Bellanger, elected in 2019.

Presidential elections 2nd round

Current National Assembly Representatives

Transport
In 1843 the railway from Paris reached the region.
The département is connected to the adjacent Eure department via the Tancarville and Pont de Normandie bridge crossings of the Seine.

Culture 
Madame Bovary by Gustave Flaubert is set in Seine Maritime.

The novel La Place by Annie Ernaux largely takes place in Seine-Maritime and describes events and changes that take place in relation to French society in the 20th century especially in relation to the rural population.

The first story of the long-running series Valérian and Laureline is set in Seine-Maritime, with the character Laureline originating from the area.

Cauchois is the dialect of the Pays de Caux, and is one of the most vibrant forms of the Norman language beyond Cotentinais.

Tourism

See also
 Arrondissements of the Seine-Maritime department
 Cantons of the Seine-Maritime department
 Communauté de communes d'Yères et Plateaux
 Communes of the Seine-Maritime department

References

External links
  Departmental Council website
  Prefecture website
  Communes 76

 
1790 establishments in France
Departments of Normandy
States and territories established in 1790